Coralie May O'Connor (May 1, 1934 – December 31, 2019) was an American competition swimmer who represented the United States at the 1952 Summer Olympics in Helsinki.  O'Connor competed in the preliminary heats of the women's 100-meter backstroke and posted a time of 1:19.7.

Three years later at the 1955 Pan American Games in Mexico City, O'Connor won a gold medal as a member of the first-place U.S. team in the women's 4×100-meter medley relay.  Her gold medal teammates included Mary Sears, Betty Mullen and Wanda Werner.  Individually, she also received a silver medal for finishing second in the women's 100-meter backstroke.

Beginning in the 1960s, O'Connor was for many years the coach of the Worcester Swim Club, a private competitive club that produced numerous prep and college swimmers.

References

1934 births
2019 deaths
American female backstroke swimmers
Olympic swimmers of the United States
Sportspeople from Worcester, Massachusetts
Swimmers at the 1952 Summer Olympics
Swimmers at the 1955 Pan American Games
Pan American Games gold medalists for the United States
Pan American Games silver medalists for the United States
Pan American Games medalists in swimming
Medalists at the 1955 Pan American Games
21st-century American women